The 1946 United States Senate election in Wisconsin was held on November 5, 1946.

Incumbent Republican U.S. Senator Robert La Follette, Jr. (who had until 1946 been a member of the Progressive Party) narrowly lost the primary election to Joseph McCarthy. McCarthy would go on to win the general election against Rep. Howard McMurray of Milwaukee in a landslide. McCarthy became the first person other than a La Follette to hold this seat since 1906.

Republican primary

Candidates
 Robert La Follette, Jr., incumbent U.S. Senator
 Joseph McCarthy, judge of Wisconsin's 10th Circuit Court
 Perry J. Stearns, candidate for Senate in 1944

Campaign
The Republican primary election was noted for its divisiveness and bitterness.

The incumbent Senator La Follette, who had just re-joined the Republican Party after the collapse of the Wisconsin Progressive Party earlier that year, was challenged by Judge Joe McCarthy of Appleton. Disbanding the Progressive Party and seeking election on the Republican ticket that same year cost him the support of many progressive supporters that belonged to the former, while the more conservative Republicans were also suspicious of La Follette, as he had previously run against them.

La Follette ran an isolationist campaign against the United Nations and was critical of Soviet dictator Joseph Stalin. Confident of victory, he remained in Washington to draft and win passage of the Legislative Reorganization Act of 1946 rather than returning to Wisconsin to campaign for re-election.

McCarthy campaigned aggressively and attacked La Follette for not enlisting during World War II, although La Follette had been 46 when Pearl Harbor was bombed and would have been too old to be accepted. McCarthy played up his own wartime service, using his wartime nickname, "Tail-Gunner Joe," and the slogan "Congress needs a tail-gunner". McCarthy also claimed that while he had been away fighting for his country, La Follette had made huge profits from investments; the suggestion that La Follette had been guilty of war profiteering was deeply damaging.

While La Follette initially started with a large lead in the polls, that lead gradually dwindled, and on the primary election day, the results of the final county to report polls tipped the scales in McCarthy's favor. La Follette sent a one-word telegram saying "Congratulations" to McCarthy.

Results

Democratic primary

Candidates
 Howard J. McMurray, U.S. Representative from Milwaukee

Results
McMurray was unopposed for the Democratic nomination.

General election

Candidates
Georgia Cozzini, candidate for Governor in 1946 (Socialist Labor)
Edwin Knappe, former State Assemblyman (1919–21) (Socialist)
Joseph McCarthy, judge of Wisconsin's 10th Circuit Court (Republican)
Howard J. McMurray, U.S. Representative from Milwaukee (Democratic)

Results

Results by county

See also 
 1946 United States Senate elections
 McCarthyism

References 

1946
Wisconsin
United States Senate
Joseph McCarthy